Khanda Man Singh Basnet was a Nepalese politician.

Singh was born in March 1907 in Kathmandu, Nepal.

In 1927, he with others founded the Prachanda Gorkha, a secret society launched to overthrow the Rana dynasty from power in Nepal.

He died of tuberculosis. Singh was a descendant of Abhiman Singh Basnyat.

Works

References

Further reading 

 

1907 births
20th-century Nepalese politicians
Nepalese activists
Nepalese politicians
Tuberculosis deaths in Nepal
Date of death unknown
20th-century deaths from tuberculosis